Chugach Census Area is a census area located in the state of Alaska, United States. It is part of the Unorganized Borough and therefore has no borough seat. On January 2, 2019, it was split from the Valdez–Cordova Census Area (of which it claims to be the successor), along with neighboring Copper River Census Area. 

As of the 2020 census, the census area had a population of 7,102; its largest communities are the cities of Valdez and Cordova.

Demographics
According to the 2010 United States Census (in which it was reported as the "Chugach Census Subarea"), the census area had a population of 6,684; 5,059 (75.7%) of whom were over the age of 18, and 798 (11.9%) of whom were over the age of 65. 5,095 residents (76.2%) were reported as White alone (4,929/73.7% non-Hispanic white), 35 (0.5%) as Black, 637 (9.5%) as American Indian or Alaska Native, 343 (5.1%) as Asian, 41 (0.6%) as Native Hawaiian or other Pacific Islander, 41 (0.6%) as some other race, and 492 (7.4%) as two or more races. 296 people (4.4%) were Hispanic or Latino (they may be of any of the above racial categories).

Communities

Cities
 Cordova
 Valdez
 Whittier

Census-designated places

 Chenega
 Tatitlek

Other places
 Eyak (within Cordova)

See also
 Chugach School District

References

Alaska census areas